Mortuary is a 1983 Indian Malayalam film, directed by Baby and produced by K. Pushparajan. The film stars Prem Nazir, Madhu, Shankar Panikkar and Balan K. Nair in the lead roles. The film has musical score by K. J. Joy. The film was remade in Tamil as Amma Pillai (1990).

Mortuary is based upon a real incident which happened in the Kottayam Medical College in the year 1977. There was a bet between two medical students to nab a cigarette from a dead body kept in a mortuary at 12 o'clock midnight. When the student came to take the cigarette, the dead body swallowed the cigarette and the student was killed due to the shock. The real culprit was the other student who was present in the mortuary lying in between the dead bodies. Police arrested the other student responsible for the death.

Cast 

Madhu as Adv. Krishnadas
Prem Nazir as DySP Rajashekhara Menon
Shankar Panikkar as Venu
Balan K. Nair as Narendran
Srividya as Justice Lakshmi Menon
Ramu as Satheesh
Maniyan Pilla Raju as Jacob
Captain Raju as Raju
C. I. Paul as Williams
T. G. Ravi as Public Prosecutor
Kuthiravattam Pappu as Watchman Gopalan
Jagannatha Varma as College Principal
Anuradha
Chandraji as Pattalam Pisharody
Kaval Surendran
Gopalakrishnan
Hari
Swapna
Sundanda
Juby
Radha

Soundtrack 
The music was composed by K. J. Joy and the lyrics were written by Poovachal Khader.

References

External links 
 
 

1983 films
1980s Malayalam-language films
Indian films based on actual events
Malayalam films remade in other languages
Films directed by Baby (director)